Jambi is a province of Indonesia. It is located on the east coast of central Sumatra and spans to the Barisan Mountains in the west. Its capital and largest city is Jambi. The province has a land area of 50,160.05 km2, and a sea area of 3,274.95 km2. It had a population of 3,092,265 according to the 2010 census and 3,548,228 according to the 2020 census. The official estimate as at mid 2021 was 3,585,119.

History

Jambi was the site of the Melayu kingdom that engaged in trade throughout the Strait of Malacca and beyond. It was recorded as having sent a mission to China in 644 CE. It was annexed by Srivijaya by 685 CE, but tried to declare its independence in the 9th century. Jambi succeeded Palembang, its southern economic and military rival, as the major player in trade in the Malacca straits. After the 1025 Chola raids in Southeast Asia, Jambi still sent missions to China.

In the early decades of the Dutch presence in the region, when the Dutch were one of several traders competing with the British, Chinese, Arabs, and Malays, the Jambi Sultanate profited from trade in pepper with the Dutch. This relationship declined by about 1770, and the sultanate had little contact with the Dutch for about sixty years.

In 1833, minor conflicts with the Dutch East Indies who were well established in Palembang, meant the Dutch increasingly felt the need to control the actions of Jambi. They coerced Sultan Facharudin to agree to greater Dutch presence in the region and control over trade, although the sultanate remained nominally independent. In 1858 the Dutch, concerned over the risk of competition for control from other foreign powers, invaded Jambi with a force from their capital Batavia. They met little resistance, and Sultan Taha fled upriver, to the inland regions of Jambi. The Dutch installed a puppet ruler, Nazarudin, in the lower region, which included the capital city. For the next forty years Taha maintained the upriver kingdom, and slowly reextended his influence over the lower regions through political agreements and marriage connections. In 1904, however, the Dutch were stronger and, as a part of a larger campaign to consolidate control over the entire archipelago,  managed to capture and kill Taha, and in 1906, the entire area was brought under direct colonial control.

Following the death of Jambi sultan, Taha Saifuddin, on 27 April 1904 and the success of the Dutch controlled areas of the Sultanate of Jambi, Jambi then was set up as a Residency and entry into the territory Netherlands Indies. Jambi's first Resident OL Helfrich was appointed by the governor general under Dutch Decree No. 20, dated 4 May 1906, with his inauguration held on 2 July 1906.

In 1945, Sumatra comprised a single province, but in 1948 this was divided into three provinces, including the province of Central Sumatra (which included present-day Jambi Province). In 1957 this short-lived province was itself divided, and Jambi was created as an independent Province.

Administrative divisions
Jambi province is divided into nine regencies (kabupaten) and two cities (kota), listed below with their areas and their populations at the 2010 and 2020 censuses, together with the official estimates as at mid 2021. These are divided into 141 districts (kecamatan), in turn sub-divided into 153 urban villages (kelurahan) and 1,399 rural villages (desa).

World Heritage sites

 Kerinci Seblat National Park
The largest of the three national parks comprising the Tropical Rainforest Heritage of Sumatra, Kerinci Seblat has the distinction of being the second-largest national park in all of Southeast Asia, only after Lorentz National Park on Papua. It is one of the Sumatran Tiger's last strongholds on the island, and within its borders sits the highest active volcano in Southeast Asia - Mount Kerinci.

 Muaro Jambi Temple Compounds

May 2011: The Jambi provincial administration is striving to have the ancient Muaro Jambi temple site at Muaro Jambi village in Maro Sebo District, Muaro Jambi Regency, recognized as a world heritage site.

The site was a Buddhist education centre that flourished during the 7th and 8th centuries and is made from bricks similar to those used in Buddhist temples in India.

Demographics
The official language of Jambi province is Indonesian as in all parts of Indonesia. However Jambi is also home to several indigenous languages and dialects such as Jambi Malay, Kerinci language, Kubu language, Lempur Malay, and Rantau Panjang Malay, all of which are Malayan languages.

Due to transmigration policy, many ethnic groups from various parts of Indonesia, especially Java, Borneo, Sulawesi and other parts of Sumatra brought their native languages as well. The non-Pribumi people such as the Chinese Indonesians speak several varieties of Chinese.

Ethnically, the population comprises:
 38% Malay
 20% Javanese
 10.2% Chinese
 10% Kerinci
 5.2% Minangkabau
 3.4% Batak
 3.3% Banjarese
 3.1% Buginese
 2.6% Sundanese, and 
 4.4% other

Islam is the largest religion in Jambi, being practised by 96.5% of the population. Minority religions are Christianity with 3%, Buddhism 0.97%, Confucianism 0.05% and Hinduism 0.25% of the population.

See also

 Putri Tangguk, a Malay traditional folklore originated from Jambi

References

Bibliography 
Locher-Scholten, Elsbeth. 1993. Rivals and rituals in Jambi, South Sumatra. Modern Asian Studies 27(3):573-591.

External links
 Official government site
 Fan site

 
Provinces of Indonesia